The 1963 Individual Speedway World Championship was the 18th edition of the official World Championship to determine the world champion rider.

Ove Fundin extended his record by winning a fourth world crown. Fellow Sweden Björn Knutsson finished second and Barry Briggs took the bronze medal.

First round
British & Commonwealth Qualifying - 56 riders to British & Commonwealth first round
Scandinavian Qualifying - 16 to Nordic Final
Continental Qualifying - 16 to Continental Final

British & Commonwealth Qualifying

Scandinavian Qualifying

Continental Qualifying

Second round
British & Commonwealth first round - 16 to British & Commonwealth finals
Scandinavian Final - 8 to European Final
Continental Final - 8 to European Final

British & Commonwealth first round

Nordic Final
June 9, 1963
 Växjö
 First 8 to European Final

Continental Final
 June 23, 1963
  Wroclaw
 First 8 to European Final plus 1 reserve

Third round
British & Commonwealth Finals - 8 to World Final
European Final - 8 to World Final

British & Commonwealth Finals
Three events with the top 8 accumulated scorers going through

Top 8 qualifying for World Final
  Barry Briggs 
  Peter Craven
  Nigel Boocock 31 pts
  Jim Lightfoot 27 pts
  Leo McAuliffe 
  Ron How 
  Peter Moore
  Dick Fisher 
res -  Tadeusz Teodorowicz

European Final
August 28, 1963
 Göteborg
 First 8 to World Final

World Final
September 14, 1963
 London, Wembley Stadium

References

1963
Individual World Championship
Individual Speedway World Championship
Individual Speedway
Speedway competitions in the United Kingdom